The Feilden Baronetcy, of Feniscowles in the County Palatine of Lancaster, is a title in the Baronetage of the United Kingdom. It was created on 21 July 1846 for William Feilden, Member of Parliament for Blackburn between 1832 and 1847. He sat as a Liberal from 1832 to 1841 then as a Conservative from then until 1847.

Feilden baronets, of Feniscowles (1846)
Sir William Feilden, 1st Baronet (1772–1850) 
Sir William Henry Feilden, 2nd Baronet (1812–1879)
Sir William Leyland Feilden, 3rd Baronet (1835–1912)
Sir William Henry Feilden, 4th Baronet (1866–1946)
Sir William Morton Buller Feilden, MC, 5th Baronet (1893–1976)
Sir Henry Wemyss Feilden, 6th Baronet (1916–2010).
Sir Henry Rudyard Feilden, 7th Baronet, BVSc, MRCVS (born 1951).

The heir apparent to the baronetcy is William Henry Feilden (born 1983), eldest son of the 7th Baronet.

Extended family

Henry Wemyss Feilden, second son of the second Baronet, was an Arctic explorer.

References

Feilden